Hamilton's Quest was a Canadian television series that ran from 1986 to 1988.

Plot
A young man discovers, after his parents die in an accident on his 18th birthday, that he was actually not their biological son. The man, Sonny Hamilton (John Pyper-Ferguson), was bewildered by this turn of events and discusses his feelings with Stickman Wilkins, owner of the local pool hall and occasional mystic. Inspired by Stickman's search for roots, Sonny sets off on his own quest for his natural parents.

References

External links

1986 Canadian television series debuts
1988 Canadian television series endings
1980s Canadian drama television series